Cardilate is a trade name for two different drugs:
 Erythritol tetranitrate (most prevalent usage of the trade name), and
 Pindolol